Grzegorz Szymański (born 12 July 1978) is a Polish volleyball player, a member of Poland men's national volleyball team in 1998-2007, silver medalist of the World Championship 2006.

Personal life
Szymański was born in Ostrowiec Świętokrzyski, Poland. He is married to Magdalena. They have a daughter Oliwia and a son Arkadiusz.

Career

Clubs
He began to play with Ostrovia Ostrowiec Swiętokrzyski, when he was 16. After that, he started playing in Sosnowiec. In 2000 he went to AZS Częstochowa, where he spent 5 years. With AZS he won second and third place in Polska Liga Siatkówki. His next club was Jastrzębski Węgiel, where he won second place in PlusLiga. He has been playing for Indykpol AZS Olsztyn since 2013.

Sporting achievements

National team
 1995  CEV U19 European Championship
 1997  FIVB U21 World Championship
 2006  FIVB World Championship

State awards
 2006  Gold Cross of Merit

References

External links 
 PlusLiga player profile

1978 births
Living people
People from Ostrowiec Świętokrzyski
Sportspeople from Świętokrzyskie Voivodeship
Polish men's volleyball players
Jastrzębski Węgiel players
AZS Częstochowa players
BKS Visła Bydgoszcz players
Projekt Warsaw players
AZS Olsztyn players
Recipients of the Gold Cross of Merit (Poland)
Opposite hitters